Castilnuevo is a municipality in the province of Guadalajara, Castile-La Mancha, Spain. It had 9 residents at the 2004 census (INE).

References

Municipalities in the Province of Guadalajara